The 2015–16 season was Oxford United's sixth consecutive season in League Two and 122nd year in existence. As well as competing in League Two, the club also participated in the FA Cup, League Cup and League Trophy. The season covers the period from 1 July 2015 to 30 June 2016.

After spending most of the season in the top three, Oxford finally confirmed automatic promotion to League One on the last day of the regular season, with a 3–0 home victory over Wycombe Wanderers. The Us finished in second place with 86 points, 13 behind runaway leaders Northampton Town. Oxford's 14 away wins in the league set a new club record for a single season. Midfielder Kemar Roofe was the club's leading scorer, with 18 league goals and 26 in all competitions.

United beat higher-division opposition in all three senior cup competitions and reached the final of the League Trophy at Wembley Stadium, only the club's third appearance at the national stadium. In the opening round of the League Cup they eliminated Brentford of the Championship with a 4–0 away win, before losing 1–0 to another Championship side, Sheffield Wednesday, in the second round. They reached the fourth round of the FA Cup, recording a notable 3–2 victory over Premier League side Swansea City in the third round, but were knocked out of the competition by Blackburn Rovers in the next round. In their run to the final of the League Trophy, they beat local rivals Swindon Town of League One in the second round, and Millwall, also of League One, over two legs in the area semi-final, before losing 3–2 to Barnsley in the final. United won the Oxfordshire Senior Cup, beating Oxford City 6–1 in the final, three days after securing their league promotion.

Transfers

Transfers in

Transfers out

Loans in

Loans out

Competitions

Pre-season friendlies
On 18 May 2015, Oxford United announced four pre-season friendlies against Didcot Town, Woking, Eastleigh and Coventry City. On 29 May 2015, Oxford United announced a trip to Austria for a week-long stay, which included a friendly against SC Wiener Neustadt.

League Two

League table

Matches
On 17 June 2015, the fixtures for the forthcoming season were announced.

Results summary

Results by round

FA Cup

The draw for the first round was made live on BBC Two on Monday 26 October 2015, with Oxford drawn away to Braintree Town.

League Cup

On 16 June 2015, the first round draw was made, Oxford United were drawn away against Brentford. In the second round, Oxford United drew another Championship side away from home, Sheffield Wednesday.

Football League Trophy

On 5 September 2015, the second round draw was shown live on Soccer AM and drawn by Charlie Austin and Ed Skrein. Oxford were drawn at home to Swindon Town. Having beaten their local rivals 2–0, Oxford were drawn away to fellow League Two side Dagenham & Redbridge in the Area Quarter-Final, a match that also ended in a 2–0 victory. Oxford beat Yeovil Town of League Two 3–2 in the Area Semi-final to meet Millwall of League One in the two-legged Area Final. Oxford won the first leg at The Den, leading scorer Kemar Roofe netting both the goals and, despite losing the second leg at the Kassam Stadium, reached the Wembley final 2–1 on aggregate.

In the final against Barnsley, United led 1–0 at half-time through a goal from Callum O'Dowda. An own-goal by Chey Dunkley early in the second half was followed by goals from Ashley Fletcher and Adam Hammill to give Barnsley a two-goal cushion. A header from Danny Hylton in the 76th minute reduced the deficit, but United were unable to find an equaliser in the remaining minutes and suffered defeat at Wembley for the first time in their history.

Squad statistics

Appearances and goals

Top scorers

Disciplinary record

References

Oxford United
Oxford United F.C. seasons